Sleep Is for the Week is the debut album by UK based songwriter Frank Turner, released on 15 January 2007 by Xtra Mile Recordings. In a 2008 interview, Turner claimed that the album was "a snapshot of pretty much exactly one year of my life". The general reception by the music press was largely positive. The artwork for the album sleeve was drawn by Chris Pell.

10th anniversary
On 27 January 2017, Xtra Mile released the 10th anniversary editions of Sleep is for the Week. This included an Xrta Mile exclusive lilac 12", a Banquet Records exclusive gold 12" limited to 500 copies, and a standard black 12".

Track listing

Singles/B-sides 

"Vital Signs" (b-side "Heartless Bastard Motherfucker"), 25 December 2006 (Download Only)

Personnel
Frank Turner - vocals, guitar, bass, banjo, laúd, keyboards
Nigel Powell - drums, percussion, keyboards, backing vocals
Rachael Birkin - violin
Jo Silverston - cello

References

2007 debut albums
Frank Turner albums
Xtra Mile Recordings albums